Kryspin Hermański is a trained ballet dancer. Born 1982 in Katowice, Poland.
He is best known for his 2008 appearance as a competitor and the third place winner on the second season of You Can Dance - the Polish version of the American television show So You Think You Can Dance, which airs on the TVN.

At the age of 10 he attended ballet school in Bytom. "I've just done what every little boy should do: obeyed my mother", he said. 
While still at school at the age of 13 he made his debut in Śląski Teatr Tańca. After graduating from a ballet school he worked for four years for Zespół Pieśni i Tańca Śląsk. He has been working in Teatr Rozrywki in Chorzów, Poland, since 2006, performing in West Side Story, Jesus Christ Superstar, Fiddler on the Roof, Rent, Jekyll & Hyde

In You Can Dance he was recognized for his versality in several different styles, including Hip hop dance, Locking, Samba, Contemporary dance.

His fans compared him to Danny Tidwell because of his technical perfection and his attitude toward a camera.

References

External links
  Official Website of Polish version of SYTYCD

Polish male dancers
1982 births
Living people
People from Katowice
So You Think You Can Dance contestants